Meridian is a former settlement in Humboldt County, California.

Meridian was laid out by Jacob Gyer in 1878.

References

Former settlements in Humboldt County, California
Former populated places in California
Populated places established in 1878